Lygniodes ochrifera is a moth of the family Erebidae. It is found in Indonesia (Sulawesi, Moluccas).

References

Moths described in 1874
Lygniodes
Moths of Indonesia